Arnaud de Villemur O.Can.S.A.  (died 28 October 1355) was a cardinal of the Catholic Church. He was bishop of Pamiers, France.

He was made cardinal on 17 December 1350 by Pope Clement VI.

Biography 

He was a member of the Canons Regular of Saint Augustine and obtained a doctorate in canon law.

Arnaud de Villemur was ordained prior of Sos (then in the diocese of Pamiers). Then, becoming a renowned canonist, he was appointed Bishop of Périgueux on October 15, 1347, then transferred to the Diocese of Pamiers on February 13, 1348. He held this position until his appointment as Cardinal of Saint Sixtus at the consistory on December 17, 1350.

He entered the Roman Curia on February 3, 1351, and participated in the Conclave of 1352 to elect Pope Innocent VI.

He died suddenly on October 28, 1355 in Avignon.

It should not be confused with two other Arnaud de Villemur: the first was a French knight and vassal of Simon de Montfort and the second abbot of Saint-Sernin de Toulouse between 1262 and 1289.

Bibliography 

 Fr. du Chesne, Histoire de tous les cardinaux françois de naissance ou qui ont été promus au cardinalat par l’expresse recommandation de nos roys, Paris, 1660. Ponce de Villemur  [archive]
 É. Baluze, Vitae paparum Avenionensium, sive collectio actorum veterum, Vol. I et II. Paris, 1693.
 Guillaume Mollat, Contribution à l’histoire du Sacré Collège de Clément V à Eugène IV, Revue d’histoire ecclésiastique, T. XLVI, 1961.

14th-century French cardinals
1355 deaths
Bishops of Pamiers
Year of birth unknown